Psalm 148 is the 148th psalm of the Book of Psalms, beginning in English in the King James Version: "Praise ye the Lord from the heavens". In Latin, it is known as "Laudate Dominum de caelis". The psalm is one of the Laudate psalms. Old Testament scholars have also classified it as a creation psalm and a wisdom psalm.

The psalm forms a regular part of Jewish, Catholic, Lutheran, Anglican and other Protestant liturgies. It has often been set to music, including a four-part metered setting in German by Heinrich Schütz as part of the Becker Psalter, and Psalm 148, a setting for voice and piano of an English metered adaptation written and composed by Leonard Bernstein in 1935, his earliest surviving work.

Background and themes
In the Septuagint, Psalms 145 to 148 are given the title "of Haggai and Zechariah". This psalm takes in all of God's creations, from the heights of the heavens, including the angels, the stars, and the sun and moon, down to the earth, the birds and insects, and the inhabitants of the ocean depths. Then it ascends again to man, and this all-encompassing view of God's creations gives him much to praise God for. Quoting Edinburgh minister John Pulsford, Charles Spurgeon notes that the last three psalms in the Book of Psalms (Psalms 148, 149, and 150) form "a triad of wondrous praise": "Heaven is full of praise, the earth is full of praise, praises rise from under the earth, 'everything that hath breath' joins in the rapture. God is encompassed by a loving, praising creation". 

British evangelist G. Campbell Morgan also notes that this is a psalm of praise, writing: "What a wonderful song this is! Look over it again, and note the fact that there is no reference in it, from first to last, to the mercy, or pity, or compassion of God. But that is because there is no reference to evil in any form".

The Midrash Tehillim identifies the entities to which the opening verses are addressed. "Praise you the Lord from the heavens" (v. 1) is addressing the ministering angels; "praise Him all you hosts" (v. 2) is addressed to those who fulfill God's will. "Praise you Him, sun and moon" (v. 3) refers to the Jewish Patriarchs and Matriarchs who are likened to the sun and moon in Joseph's dream. "Praise Him, all you stars of light" (v. 3) refers to righteous individuals, as Daniel said, "And they that turn the many to righteousness as the stars forever and ever". The Midrash adds, "From this you learn that every [righteous individual] has his own star in heaven, and that his star shines according to his deeds".

Text

Hebrew Bible version

King James Version
 Praise ye him, all his angels: praise ye him, all his hosts. 
 Praise ye him, sun and moon: praise him, all ye stars of light. 
 Praise him, ye heavens of heavens, and ye waters that be above the heavens. 
 Let them praise the name of the : for he commanded, and they were created. 
 He hath also stablished them for ever and ever: he hath made a decree which shall not pass. 
 Fire, and hail; snow, and vapours; stormy wind fulfilling his word: 
 Mountains, and all hills; fruitful trees, and all cedars: 
 Beasts, and all cattle; creeping things, and flying fowl: 
 Kings of the earth, and all people; princes, and all judges of the earth: 
 Both young men, and maidens; old men, and children: 
 Let them praise the name of the : for his name alone is excellent; his glory is above the earth and heaven.
 He also exalteth the horn of his people, the praise of all his saints; even of the children of Israel, a people near unto him.

Verse 14
He has exalted the horn of His people,
The praise of all His saints—
Of the children of Israel,
A people near to Him.
Praise the Lord!
Matthew Poole notes that in scripture, the "horn" generally denotes "strength, victory, glory, and felicity".

Uses

Judaism
Alexander Kirkpatrick observes that this psalm was "obviously written for liturgical use". It is recited in its entirety during Pesukei Dezimra, the first section of the daily morning prayer service.

Verses 1–6 are recited at the opening to Kiddush Levanah in the Ashkenazi tradition, and during the same prayer in some Sephardic traditions. Verses 1–6 are also recited during Birkat Hachama, the blessing on the sun.

Verse 7 is the verse said by the sea monsters in the ancient text of Perek Shirah.

The first part of verse 13, beginning with the word "Yehallelu", is said by the Hazzan as he returns the Torah scroll to the ark during morning services; the congregation recites the last part of this verse and continues with the recital of verse 14. In the Italian rite, they begin with verse 12.

Catholic Church
 
Psalm 148 is one of the Laudate psalms and was sung as one of a trio of psalms, Psalms 148, 149, and 150, during Lauds in the Roman rite. Around 530 A.D., St. Benedict of Nursia chose these three psalms for the office of morning celebrated daily. In the Liturgy of the Hours, Psalm 148 is recited during Sunday Lauds in the third week.

Literature
John Milton paraphrased some of the praises in this psalm in his epic poem Paradise Lost, Book 5.

Architecture 
Church buildings have been decorated with creatures mentioned in Psalm 148, including the Irish Honan Chapel which refers to it in inscription and mosaics, and St John the Evangelist's Church, Crawshawbooth, Scotland, with carvings. The Riverside Church in Manhattan features elements mentioned in Psalm 148 carved in oak on the ends of the choir stalls.

Musical settings
"Erfreue dich, Himmel, erfreue dich, Erde" is a hymn in German, in which Maria Luise Thurmair paraphrased Psalm 148 in 1969, based on an older Christmas carol. 

Heinrich Schütz composed a four-part setting of a metric German version for the Becker Psalter, " (Praise, ye Heavens, God the Lord), SWV 253. Marc-Antoine Charpentier set in 1679-1680 one "Laudate Dominum de coelis", H.177, for three voices, two treble instruments, and continuo. 

Darwall's 148th is John Darwell's musical setting for Psalm 148, composed for the inauguration of a new organ in Walsall parish church, then in Staffordshire, England.

The first six verses of Psalm 148 have been set to music as a Hebrew song. American composer Leonard Bernstein adapted the text for his Psalm 148, a setting for voice and piano and dated in 1935, his earliest surviving composition. Alan Hovhaness adapted the text in 1958 for his setting for chorus and organ, split as two separate pieces (opus 160 Praise Ye Him, All His Angels and 160a Let Them Praise the Name of the Lord) when published by C.F. Peters.

References

Sources

External links 

 in Hebrew and English - Mechon-mamre
 
 
 Text of Psalm 148 according to the 1928 Psalter
 Psalm 148 – Let Heaven and Earth Praise the LORD text and detailed commentary, enduringword.com
 Hallelujah! Praise the LORD from the heavens; praise him in the heights. text and footnotes, usccb.org United States Conference of Catholic Bishops
 Psalm 148:1 introduction and text, biblestudytools.com
 Psalm 148 / Refrain: O praise the name of the Lord. Church of England
 Psalm 148 at biblegateway.com

 

148
Pesukei dezimra
Siddur of Orthodox Judaism